Ádám Komlósi (born 6 December 1977 in Budapest) is a Hungarian football player who currently plays for Debreceni VSC.

Club career
In 2002/03, he won the Hungarian championship for the first time with MTK Hungaria FC.

After a disappointing 6th-place finish in the Hungarian championship in 2003/04, he moved on to Debreceni VSC who finished 3rd in that season.

Since his move to the Debrecen side, Ádám won 3 Hungarian championship in a row from 2005 to 2007.

International career
In season 2003/04, he was called up by Lothar Matthäus in the Hungarian national squad.

After Mathaeus departure, Péter Bozsik became the head coach of the national team and Ádám Komlósi was again selected to play in international friendlies matches against New Zealand and England. However, in the second match Ádám Komlósi was injured and replaced by Vilmos Vanczák and since then was much less present with the national side.

National team 

Komlósi making his debut on 18 February 2004, in Paphos against Armenia.

(Statistics correct as of 16 August 2009)

International matches

External links
 Ádám Komlósi at UEFA.com
 
 http://www.dvsc.hu
 http://www.mtkhungaria.hu

1977 births
Living people
Footballers from Budapest
Hungarian footballers
Association football defenders
Hungary international footballers
Hungary youth international footballers
Hungary under-21 international footballers
Kazincbarcikai SC footballers
Budapesti VSC footballers
MTK Budapest FC players
Debreceni VSC players